The A382 is a road in South West England, connecting Newton Abbot to the A38, then to Bovey Tracey and on through Moretonhampstead to the A30.

Route
The road starts in Newton Abbot at the junction with the A381, continuing out through the town, past the connection to the A383 which links to the A38 southbound.

It continues past Stover School, Stover Country Park and the Newton Abbot branch of Trago Mills before arriving at the junction with the A38, known as Drumbridges. From the A38 roundabout, the road continues in a straight line for 2 km, known locally as the "Bovey Straight" across Bovey Heath, with Heathfield on the east and Great Plantation on the west towards Bovey Tracey.

The road used to go through the centre of Bovey Tracey, but since 1987 it has bypassed the town, following part of the route of the old Moretonhampstead and South Devon Railway line, from where that line crossed the road near the former Bovey Tracey Pottery to just north of the junction with the B3387 road to Widecombe-in-the-Moor and Haytor. The former Bovey railway station was retained at the side of the road and is now a heritage centre.

The bypass continues on a northerly route west of the town until it joins the original winding road which follows the valley of the Wray Brook. It passes the former Hawkmoor County Sanatorium and the village of Lustleigh before arriving in the town of Moretonhampstead where the B3212 heads towards Postbridge and Princetown in one direction and towards Exeter in the other.

From here, the A382 continues north-west, through the small settlements of Easton and Sandypark, eventually arriving at Whiddon Down, where there is a bypass around the village, before the road joins up with the A30 road at a recent junction which was completed in 2006 which was formerly a roundabout

Accidents and deaths
The A382 saw five fatal accidents between 1999 and 2010, two resulting in the death of a car driver, and three in the death of a motorcyclist. The road carries warning signs specifically related to motorcycle accidents, indicating 13 accidents over 3 years between Bovey Tracey and Moretonhampstead.

References

Sources

Roads in England
Transport in Devon
Roads in Devon